Jumbo jet most commonly refers to:

 Wide-body aircraft
 Boeing 747 originally and specifically

Jumbo Jet may also refer to:

Roller coasters
 Jumbo Jet (Cedar Point), a roller coaster formerly at Cedar Point amusement park.
 Jumbo Jet (Six Flags Great Adventure), a roller coaster formerly at Six Flags Great Adventure amusement park.
 Jumbo Jet (Morey's Piers), a roller coaster formerly at Morey's Piers amusement park.

See also
 Jumbo (disambiguation)
 Jet (disambiguation)
 Airbus A380, "Super Jumbo Jet", specifically 
 Boeing 777, "Mini Jumbo Jet", specifically